James Wilshire may refer to:

James Robert Wilshire (1809–1860), Australian politician
James Thompson Wilshire (1837–1909), Australian politician, son of the above